The Association Royale des Descendants des Lignages de Bruxelles (French) (Dutch: Koninklijke Vereniging der Afstammelingen van de Brusselse Geslachten) is a hereditary organization of individuals who have documented their descent from at least one member of the Seven Noble Houses of Brussels.

History 

Like the nobility, the Seven Noble Houses (or lineages) of Brussels were abolished during the French occupation. But whereas the nobility was officially recognised after the Belgian revolution of 1830, the lineages of Brussels were not. The Association was founded in 1961 as an asbl (non-profit) with the aim of bringing the descendants of the Seven Noble Houses together.

Activities 
The descendants of the Seven Noble Houses are currently united within this organization which perpetuates their existence and their rituals dating back to the Middle Ages. For example, every year, the organisation takes an active part in the organization of the Ommegang.

Publications 
The organization's main publications are:

Les filiations lignagères: a yearly genealogical publication that shows the lineage of members back to their ancestors who held positions as members the Seven Noble Houses;
 Le Valet: a quarterly periodic that keeps members up to date on the activities and news of the association;
Le Bulletin.

Post-nominal letters 
People officially admitted to the Association are entitled to use the following post-nominal letters: PB (Patricius Bruxellensis) for all members and NPB (Nobilis Patricius Bruxellensis) in case they are members of the Belgian nobility.

Gallery

Notes and references

Further reading 

 Olivier de Trazegnies, «Les sept lignages de Bruxelles», in : L'Éventail, May 2009, pp. 92-94.
 Serge Quoidbach, Nicolas Keszei, and Michel Lauwers, «Association royale des descendants des lignages de Bruxelles», in : Noblesse is business, Brussels : Racine, 2017, pp. 148-149.

See also 

List of hereditary and lineage organizations
Genealogical and Heraldic Office of Belgium
Seven Noble Houses of Brussels :
House of Sweerts
House of Sleeus
House of Coudenbergh
House of Serhuyghs
House of Serroelofs
House of Roodenbeke

External links 

 Official website
Company information

Family associations
Lineage societies